This is a list of Belgian television related events from 1969.

Events

Debuts

Television shows

Ending this year

Births
5 January - Mark Tijsmans, actor, singer & children's author
24 February - Johan Terryn, actor & TV & radio host
11 July - An Swartenbroekx, actress, TV host & singer
19 July - Daisy Thys, actress
29 July - Kadèr Gürbüz, actress & TV host

Deaths